The 2010–11 football season was Northampton Town Football Club's 33rd season in the Football League Two, the fourth division of English football, and their 103rd as a professional club. It officially began on 1 July 2010, and concluded on 30 June 2011, although competitive matches were only played between August and May. The team's shirt supplier was Erreà, and the shirt sponsor was Jackson Grundy.

Players

Competitions

League Two

League table

Results summary

League position by match

Matches

FA Cup

Carling Cup

Johnstone's Paint Trophy

Appearances, goals and cards

Awards

Club awards
At the end of the season, Northampton's annual award ceremony, including categories voted for by the players and backroom staff, the supporters, will see the players recognised for their achievements for the club throughout the 2010–11 season.

Transfers

Transfers in

Loans in

Loans out

Released

References

External links
Northampton Town F.C. – Official website

2009-10
North